France–South Korea relations have spanned over a period from the 19th century to the present. In 2016, France and Korea celebrated the 130th anniversary of diplomatic ties between the countries.

According to a 2013 BBC World Service Poll, 70% of South Koreans view France's influence positively, with only 11% expressing a negative view. French views of South Korea vary, with 42% viewing South Korea negatively, and 46% viewing South Korea positively.

France is one of the two European Union states, along with Estonia, and one of five UN states, along with the United States, along with South Korea and Japan, that do not recognize or maintain diplomatic relations with North Korea.

Country comparison

History

Infiltration of Catholic priests 

Initial French involvement in the 19th century focused on facilitating and defending the spread of Catholic Christianity in Korea. The first French missionary to Korea, Father Philippe Maubant, arrived in the country in 1836. After that date, missionaries would continue to come to Korea from China, often at great risks.

In September 1846, the French Admiral Jean-Baptiste Cécille sailed to Korea in order to obtain the release of an imprisoned Korean priest named Andrew Kim Taegon, but Kim was soon executed.

In 1847, after various involvements in Vietnam and Okinawa, Cécille again sailed to Korea to try to infiltrate some missionaries, but his ship ran aground and he had to be rescued by a British ship.

French Campaign against Korea (1866) 

In 1866, reacting to greater numbers of Korean converts to Catholicism as well as the humiliations suffered by China at the hands of Westerners during the First and Second Opium Wars, the Korean court clamped down on the illicit French missionaries, massacring French Catholic missionaries and Koreans converts alike.

That same year France launched a punitive expedition against Korea, invading and occupying portions of Ganghwa Island in the fall of 1866. At the first battle, the Korean infantry division lost heavily, and General Yang Heon-su concluded that only a large cavalry division could stand up to French firepower. An ambush by Korean forces on a French party attempting to occupy the strategically located Cheondeung Temple 傳燈寺 on the island's south coast resulted in French casualties. French realization that they were far outnumbered and outgunned forced them to abandon the island and their expedition. The entire incident later became known as the byeong-in yang-yo, or foreign disturbance of the byeong-in year (1866).

Diplomatic relations (1886) 

France and Korea established their first official relations in 1886 after an unequal treaty France–Korea Treaty of 1886. In 1887, France sent its first official representative, Victor Collin de Plancy along with his translator, Maurice Courant. He [Courant] would later be known as the "father" of Korean studies in France. In France, the first records of a Korean living there permanently, Hong Jong-u, who arrived there not too long after official relations were established. Arriving in Marseille in 1890, he will spend a few years working in France in a museum where he would be very helpful in establishing the first Korean Art and Culture section. Yet, it would not be until the 1900 Paris World's Fair/Exposition Universelle that Korea would be "introduced" to the French public.

Interruption of diplomatic relations (1906-1949) 
Japan's invasion of Korea led to a break in Franco-Korean relations. For more than 40 years, from 1906 to 1949, France did not have a diplomatic representation in Korea. Yet, despite the fact that the embassy was closed, this did not mean that relations ended altogether. In 1919, a delegation of the Korean government in exile was opened in Paris in 1919, which acted as the liaison between the two entities during those difficult years. In 1949, the embassy was officially re-opened and a new ambassador took office in Seoul. Unfortunately for him, he was taken prisoner and spent three years, from 1950 to 1953, in North Korea until he was released and granted a diplomatic post in a different country.

Korean War 
The Korean War was a turning point that helped strengthen relations between the two countries. Before that time, relations had always been more or less limited to a few individuals at the governmental level. The war introduced Korea to the French public as a whole, as the war raged on. From 1950 to 1953, 3,200 French soldiers assisted South Korea by taking part in the Korean War; 270 were killed.

French participation in the Korean War improved cultural and economic links between the two countries. Indeed, while the history of South Korea would be quite charged for the following decades, the two countries still maintained normal diplomatic relations. 2002 was the first time that the number of French citizens present in South Korea surpassed the number seen during the Korean War, as 6,000 to 7,000 French citizens claimed residency in South Korea.

Present day 
France and South Korea still maintain very good relations. This was seen especially on the question of North Korea, which is of course a matter of great importance for both countries.

Besides bilateral cooperation, France and South Korea also work together in international organizations such as the United Nations, UNESCO, the OECD, etc.

On the matter of North Korea, France is one of the few European countries to not have official diplomatic relations with the DPRK. Also, France has supported the Six-party talks as well as the role of the IAEA in finding solutions to the nuclear issue.

Economic and cultural relations 
Economic relations between the two nations are strong. French exports to South Korea were worth €2.6 billion Euros in 2006, and France was the seventh largest investor in the Republic of Korea. South Korean exports to France during the same period were worth €4.1 billion.

Cultural relations are enhanced by the presence of a French Cultural Centre in Korea, along with that of the Alliance française.

There are approximately 7,000 South Koreans living in France (excludes Korean French adoptees), and 2,000 French people living in South Korea.

One of the most prominent Korean scholars of French literature was Kim Bung-gu (1922~ 1991).

The French government describes its relations with South Korea as "excellent".

Resident diplomatic missions 
 France has an embassy in Seoul.
 South Korea has an embassy in Paris.

See also 
 Foreign relations of France
 Foreign relations of South Korea
 French Battalion in the Korean War
 French Campaign against Korea, 1866
 French-North Korean relations
 French people in Korea
 Koreans in France

References

External links 
 Embassy of France in the Republic of Korea: Official website of the French Embassy in Korea
 Embassy of the Republic of Korea in France: Address of the Republic of Korea's Embassy in France
 Korean Cultural Center in Paris: Centre Culturel Coreen
 French Korean Chamber of Commerce and Industry, Seoul : French Korean Chamber of Commerce and Industry
 French Participation in the Korean War: Embassy of France in the United States

 
South Korea
Bilateral relations of South Korea
South Korea